The 2002 Michigan Secretary of State election was held on Tuesday, November 5, 2002 to elect the Michigan Secretary of State for a four-year term. Incumbent Republican Candice Miller was term-limited and unable to seek a third term.

Candidates

Republican Party
Former Kent County Clerk Terri Lynn Land won the party's nomination during the state convention.

Democratic Party
Lawyer Melvin "Butch" Hollowell won the party's nomination during the state convention.

Results

References

External links

2002 Michigan elections
Michigan Secretary of State elections
Michigan
November 2002 events in the United States